Brandi Cyrus is an American actress and DJ. She used to co-host Cyrus vs. Cyrus: Design and Conquer on Bravo and is a co-host of the Your Favorite Thing podcast.

Personal life 
Her mother is Leticia "Tish" Cyrus, and her father is country singer Billy Ray Cyrus, who adopted her and her younger brother Trace as toddlers after he married Tish. Her siblings include brother Braison and sisters Miley and Noah Cyrus.

As of June 2019, Cyrus lives in Los Angeles, California.

Filmography 
 2007: Hannah Montana: Live in London
 2007: Billy Ray Cyrus: Home at Last
 2008: Zoey 101
 2008-2011: Hannah Montana
 2009: Hannah Montana: The Movie
 2011: What's Up
 2013: Piers Morgan Tonight
 2013: Truly Tish
 2014: Brandiville
 2014: MTV Video Music Awards
 2015: Old 37
 2015: Celebrity P.O.V.
 2015: The Queue
 2016: Entertainment Tonight
 2016: Access Hollywood
 2017: Cyrus vs. Cyrus: Design and Conquer

References

External links 
 

Living people
Actresses from Nashville, Tennessee
Musicians from Nashville, Tennessee
Place of birth missing (living people)
American television actresses
Brandi Cyrus
Year of birth missing (living people)
21st-century American women